Kampong Pengkalan Gadong (also Kampong Pangkalan Gadong) is a village in Brunei-Muara District, Brunei, as well as a neighbourhood and commercial area in the capital Bandar Seri Begawan. The population was 3,147 in 2016. It is one the villages within Mukim Gadong 'B'. The postcode is BE3719.

The village encompasses Gadong and Batu Bersurat/Pengkalan Gadong which are among the commercial clusters in Bandar Seri Begawan.

References 

Neighbourhoods in Bandar Seri Begawan
Villages in Brunei-Muara District